Emanuel Montejano Arroyo  (born 12 July 2001) is a Mexican professional footballer who plays as a forward for Liga MX club UNAM.

Club career
Montejano made his professional debut with Pumas UNAM on January 17, 2020, in win against Mazatlán where he assisted and scored a goal.

Career statistics

Club

References

Mexican footballers
Club Universidad Nacional footballers
Association football forwards
Footballers from Mexico City
2001 births
Living people
People from Mexico City